Nin Saphon  (born 6 July 1948) is a Cambodian politician. She belongs to the Cambodian People's Party and was elected to represent Takeo Province in the National Assembly of Cambodia in 2003.

References

1948 births
Members of the National Assembly (Cambodia)
Living people
Cambodian People's Party politicians
20th-century Cambodian women
21st-century Cambodian women politicians
21st-century Cambodian politicians